"Stairway to Heaven" is a song released by English rock group Led Zeppelin in 1971.

Stairway to Heaven may also refer to:

Music
 "Stairway to Heaven" (Pure Soul song), a 1996 R&B song by Pure Soul
 "Stairway to Heaven" (Neil Sedaka song), a Top 10 pop hit by Neil Sedaka in 1960
 "Stairway to Heaven", a song by the O'Jays from their album Family Reunion 
 "Stairway to Heaven," a song by Be Your Own Pet
 "Stairway to Heaven," a song by Sabaton

Film and television
 Stairway to Heaven, the U.S. alternative title for the 1946 British film A Matter of Life and Death, also the title of radio, television and theatrical adaptations of the film
 Stairway to Heaven (South Korean TV series), a 2003–2004 South Korean television series
 Stairway to Heaven (Philippine TV series), a 2009–2010 Philippine television series based on the South Korean drama of the same name
 "Stairway to Heaven", an episode of the anime series Black Heaven
 "Stairway to Heaven", the first episode of the series First Person
 "Stairway to Heaven", a fifth-season episode of Grey's Anatomy
 The Crow: Stairway to Heaven, a 1998–1999 Canadian television series

Places
 The Haiku Stairs, a mountain trail in Hawaii also known as "the Stairway to Heaven"
 Escalera al Cielo (Stairway to Heaven), a steep mountain trail leading to an ancient Mayan site in Kiuic, Yucatan in Mexico
 A 17-kilometre long mountain route in Ras al-Khaimah, United Arab Emirates, once linking the coast with a mountain village
 A 7.5–kilometre long mountain route in Cuilcagh, on the Cavan and Fermanagh border in Ireland

Other uses
 Stairway to Heaven: Led Zeppelin Uncensored, a book by Richard Cole documenting his experience as Led Zeppelin's tour manager
 The Stairway to Heaven, a book by Zecharia Sitchin
 Stairway to Heaven, a title given to the Blessed Virgin Mary in the litany of Loreto
 "Stairway to Heaven", a 2017 memorial outside Bethnal Green tube station, London, commemorating the 1943 disaster in which 173 people died

See also
 Stairway to Heaven/Highway to Hell, a 1989 compilation album featuring bands that performed at the Moscow Music Peace Festival
 Stairways to Heaven, a compilation album of covers of the Led Zeppelin song which appeared on the Australian television program The Money or the Gun
 Jacob's Ladder, a stairway to Heaven described in the Book of Genesis
 Sullam al-sama', an early 15th-century Persian astronomical treatise whose title can be translated as Stairway of Heaven
 Heaven's Stairway (1998-2006), an Eastern Canadian cannabis seedbank
 Stairway to Hell (disambiguation)